Garry Croker (born 2 November 1964)  is an Australian Paralympic wheelchair rugby and table tennis player. He was born in Cowra, New South Wales.  He participated in table tennis at the 1984 Paralympics and the 1988 Seoul Paralympics. He was part of the Australia national wheelchair rugby team at the 1996 Atlanta and 2000 Sydney Paralympics, winning a silver medal with the team in the latter competition.

After his Paralympic career finished, Croker took up handcycling and competed in triathlons. In April 2017, he was banned from racing in the  Canberra Times Running Festival half marathon due to his inability to complete the course under 60 minutes. Croker commented that "the time was unattainable, as it was faster than the world record for his class".

References

Paralympic table tennis players of Australia
Paralympic wheelchair rugby players of Australia
Table tennis players at the 1988 Summer Paralympics
Wheelchair rugby players at the 1996 Summer Paralympics
Wheelchair rugby players at the 2000 Summer Paralympics
Paralympic silver medalists for Australia
Living people
Medalists at the 2000 Summer Paralympics
1964 births
ACT Academy of Sport alumni
Paralympic medalists in wheelchair rugby
People from Cowra
Sportsmen from New South Wales